The 2019 Somerset West and Taunton District Council election took place on 2 May 2019 to elect members of Somerset West and Taunton District Council in Somerset, England. This was the first election since the West Somerset District Council and Taunton Deane merged, with the whole council being up for election.

Overall election result

Results by Ward

Alcombe

Blackbrook & Holway

Comeytrowe & Bishop's Hull

Cotford St Luke & Oake

Creech St Michael

Dulverton & District

Exmoor

Halcon & Lane

Hatch & Blackdown

Manor & Tangier

Milverton & District

Minehead Central

Minehead North

Monument

North Curry & Ruishton

North Town

Norton Fitzwarren & Stapelgrove

Old Cleeve & District

Periton & Woodcombe

Porlock & District

Priorswood

Quantock Vale

Rockwell Green

South Quantock

Trull, Pitminster & Corfe

Victoria

Vivary

Watchet & Williton

Wellington East

Wellington North

Wellington South

Wellsprings & Rowbarton

West Monkton & Cheddon Fitzpaine

Wilton & Sherford

Wiveliscombe & District

By-elections

Vivary

Norton Fitzwarren & Staplegrove

Trull, Pitminster & Corfe

Old Cleeve & District

North Curry & Ruishton

Wilton & Sherford

Alcombe

 
 
 

 

Somerset West and Taunton District Council elections
2019 English local elections
May 2019 events in the United Kingdom
2010s in Somerset